"Winner" is the fourth single by British ska/indie band Kid British, released on 28 June 2010. It was released to coincide with the 2010 World Cup, and featured on their debut album To Get Nowhere, Follow the Crowd.

The video for the single features former West Ham United and England forward Sir Geoff Hurst and Manchester City defender Nedum Onuoha.

The song also features on the 2010 FIFA World Cup South Africa video game.

Track listing
"Winner"
"Let's Av a Party"

References

2009 singles
2009 songs
Kid British songs
Mercury Records singles